The 1992–93 Delaware Fightin' Blue Hens men's basketball team represented the University of Delaware during the 1992–93 NCAA Division I men's basketball season. The Fightin' Blue Hens, led by eighth-year head coach Steve Steinwedel, played their home games at the Delaware Field House and were members of the North Atlantic Conference. They finished the season 22–8, 10–4 in NAC play to finish third in the conference regular season standings. They were champions of the NAC tournament to earn an automatic bid to the NCAA tournament where they lost in the opening round to No. 4 seed Louisville.

Roster

Schedule and results

|-
!colspan=9 style=| Regular season

|-
!colspan=9 style=| NAC tournament

|-
!colspan=9 style=| NCAA tournament

Players in the 1993 NBA draft

References

Delaware Fightin' Blue Hens men's basketball seasons
Delaware
Delaware
Fight
Fight